Rob Wilkinson (born 22 February 1992) is an Australian mixed martial artist who competes in the Light heavyweight division of Professional Fighters League (PFL). A professional competitor since 2011, he previously competed in the Middleweight division of the Ultimate Fighting Championship and was the middleweight champion in Australian Fighting Championship and BRACE.

Background
Wilkinson was born in Hobart, Tasmania, Australia where he currently resides.  Wilkinson started training at the age of 17 at Hobart’s Hybrid Training Centre, and was a personal trainer prior to taking up a career in MMA. He started training MMA after watching a video on YouTube of Randy Couture which he instantly fell in love with the sport.

Mixed martial arts career

Early career
Wilkinson made his professional debut in 2011 and amassed a record of 11-0. He has won all fights via stoppage but one and holds 9 out of his 11 fights in the 1st round, en route to capturing both Australian Fighting Championship middleweight title and BRACE middleweight championship belt. He last competed in a battle of undefeated fighters, submitted German Alexander Poppeck in the first round in Finland prior signed by UFC.

Ultimate Fighting Championship
Wilkinson made his promotional debut on 2 September 2017 at UFC Fight Night: Volkov vs. Struve, replacing injured Abu Azaitar, against Siyar Bahadurzada. He lost the fight via TKO in round two, handing him his first career loss.

Wilkinson faced Israel Adesanya on 11 February 2018 at UFC 221. He lost the fight via TKO in the second round.

On 14 August 2018 it was announced that Wilkinson was released from UFC.

Post-UFC career
In 2019, Wilkinson competed in two kickboxing bouts, winning both and earning a record of 2-0.

Almost two years since his previous MMA bout, Wilkinson moved up to the light heavyweight division and faced Dylan Andrews at AFC 23 on 1 December 2019. He won the fight via first-round submission.

On 9 April 2021 Wilkinson defeated Daniel Almeida via first round TKO, winning the Hex Fight Series Light Heavyweight Championship.

Wilkinson was scheduled to defend his title against Sam Kei at Hex Fight 22 on 9 July 2021. However, the bout was scrapped due to unknown reason.

Professional Fighters League

2022 Season 
Wilkinson faced Bruce Souto on April 23, 2022 at PFL 1. He won the bout via ground and pound technical knockout in the second round.

Wilkinson faced Viktor Pešta on June 17, 2022 at PFL 4. He won the bout via TKO stoppage in the first round.

Wilkinson faced Delan Monte in the Semifinals off the Light Heavyweight tournament on August 5, 2022 at PFL 7.  He won the bout in the first round, knocking out Monte after landing a knee and then finishing him off with punches.

In the finals of the Light Heavyweight tournament, Wilkinson faced Omari Akhmedov on November 25, 2022 at PFL 10. He won the bout after the fight was stopped by the doctor due to a cut after the second round, also winning the $1 million collective tournament pool.

2023 Season 
Wilkinson will start of the 2023 season against Thiago Santos on April 1, 2023 at PFL 1.

Boxing career
Having problems finding mixed martial arts fights, Wilkinson opted to compete also in boxing, making his debut against Jayden Joseph for the vacant Tasmanian Heavyweight title on 30 October 2021. He won the fight via fifth-round technical knockout.

Championships and accomplishments

Mixed martial arts
Professional Fighters League
 2022 PFL Light Heavyweight Championship
Australian Fighting Championship
 AFC Middleweight Championship (One time)
BRACE
 BRACE Middleweight Championship (One time)
Hex Fight Series
 Hex Fight Series Light Heavyweight Championship (one time)

Mixed martial arts record

|-
|Win
|align=center|17–2
|Omari Akhmedov
|TKO (doctor stoppage)
|PFL 10
|
|align=center|2
|align=center|5:00
|New York City, New York, United States
|
|-
|Win
|align=center|16–2
|Delan Monte
|KO (punches and knee)
|PFL 7
|
|align=center|1
|align=center|1:37
|New York City, New York, United States
|
|-
|Win
|align=center|15–2
|Viktor Pesta
|TKO (punches)
|PFL 4
|
|align=center|1
|align=center|3:03
|Atlanta, Georgia, United States
|
|-
|Win
|align=center|14–2
|Bruce Souto
|TKO (punches)
|PFL 1
|
|align=center|2
|align=center|0:46
|Arlington, Texas, United States
|
|-
|Win
|align=center|13–2
|Daniel Almeida
|KO (punches)
|Hex Fight Series 21
|
|align=center|1
|align=center|1:22
|Melbourne, Australia
| 
|-
|Win
|align=center|12–2
|Dylan Andrews
|Submission (guillotine choke)
|Australian Fighting Championship 23
|
|align=center|1
|align=center|3:03
|Melbourne, Australia
|
|-
|Loss
|align=center|11–2
|Israel Adesanya
|TKO (knees and punches)
|UFC 221 
|
|align=center|2
|align=center|3:37
|Perth, Australia
|
|-
|Loss
|align=center|11–1
|Siyar Bahadurzada
|TKO (punches)
|UFC Fight Night: Volkov vs. Struve 
|
|align=center|2
|align=center|3:10
|Rotterdam, Netherlands
|
|-
| Win
| align=center| 11–0
| Alexander Poppeck
| Submission (rear-naked choke)
| Euro Fighting Championship 1
| 
| align=center| 1
| align=center| 3:51
| Espoo, Finland 
| 
|-
| Win
| align=center| 10–0
| Jamie Abdallah
| TKO (punches)
| Australia Fighting Championship 15
| 
| align=center| 3
| align=center| 4:07
| Melbourne, Australia
| 
|-
| Win
| align=center| 9–0
| Daniel Schardt
| Submission (guillotine choke) 
| Australia Fighting Championship 14
| 
| align=center| 1
| align=center| 3:28
| Melbourne, Australia
|
|-
| Win
| align=center| 8–0
| Gerhard Voigt
| Submission (rear-naked choke)
| Brace For War: Tournament Season 1 Final
| 
| align=center| 1
| align=center| 3:45
|Canberra, Australia 
|
|-
| Win
| align=center| 7–0
| Rick Alchin
| TKO (elbows)
| Brace For War 28
| 
| align=center| 1
| align=center| 4:16
| Sydney, Australia
|
|-
| Win
| align=center| 6–0
| Kitt Campbell
| Submission (triangle choke)
| Brace For War 27
| 
| align=center| 1
| align=center| 1:32
| Canberra, Australia 
|
|-
| Win
| align=center| 5–0
|Ben Kelleher
| Decision (unanimous)
| Submission 4
| 
| align=center| 3
| align=center| 5:00
|Alice Springs, Australia 
|
|-
| Win
| align=center| 4–0
| Ady Sutton
| Submission (armbar)
| Valor Fight 3
| 
| align=center| 1
| align=center| 3:47
| Launceston, Australia
|
|-
| Win
| align=center| 3–0
| Ty Shar
| Submission (rear-naked choke)
| Sport Fight 31
| 
| align=center| 1
| align=center| 1:42
| Manson, Washington, United States
|
|-
| Win
| align=center| 2–0
| Marc Gehret
| TKO (punches)
| Brace For War 14
| 
| align=center| 1
| align=center| 4:55
| Canberra, Australia
|
|-
| Win
| align=center| 1–0
| Dallas Wilkinson-Reed
| TKO (punches)
| Brace For War 12
| 
| align=center| 1
| align=center|N/A
| Hobart, Australia
|
|-

Professional boxing record

Kickboxing record

|-  style="background:#CCFFCC;"
| 2019-08-24|| Win ||align=left| Patrick Dittrich || Tasmanian Fighting Championships 2 || Hobart, Australia || Decision (split) || 5 || 3:00
|-
|-  style="background:#CCFFCC;"
| 2019-05-18|| Win ||align=left| Joe Tullo || Tasmanian Fighting Championships 1 || Hobart, Australia || KO || 2 || 1:28
|-
|-
| colspan=9 | Legend:

See also
 List of current PFL fighters
 List of male mixed martial artists

References

External links
 
 

Living people
1992 births
Sportspeople from Sydney
Sportspeople from Hobart
Sportsmen from New South Wales
Sportsmen from Tasmania
Australian male mixed martial artists
Middleweight mixed martial artists
Mixed martial artists utilizing kickboxing
Mixed martial artists utilizing boxing
Mixed martial artists utilizing Brazilian jiu-jitsu
Ultimate Fighting Championship male fighters
Australian male boxers
Australian practitioners of Brazilian jiu-jitsu